The Belgrade Stock Exchange (abbr. BELEX) is a stock exchange based in Belgrade, Serbia. The Stock exchange was founded in 1894 in the Kingdom of Serbia, after the King proclaimed the Stock exchange law of 1886. Currently, the Belgrade Stock Exchange is a full member of Federation of Euro-Asian Stock Exchanges (FEAS) and an associate member of Federation of European Securities Exchanges (FESE).

History

The first ideas about establishing an institution which would control the movement of the value of money appeared in Serbia in the 1830s. The Serbian Trading Association, important for the development of the entire Serbian economy, initiated the passing of the Stock Exchange Law. The national Assembly adopted the Law on 3. November 1886, and the Law was proclaimed by the then King of Serbia Milan M. Obrenović. Several years later, on 21. November 1894, in "Građanska kasina" the Belgrade Stock Exchange held its Founding Assembly and selected the management and exchange intermediaries. The purpose of founding the Exchange was to promote, facilitate and regulate trading in various commodities, all securities allowed to be quoted, cheques and coupons, coins and paper money.

The first trading sessions were held in the hotel "Bosna" on the bank of the river Sava, where exporters met and prepared contracts for food and prunes. At that time, only one trading session was held and in one room all transactions were concluded (currency, money, goods). As trading developed, two departments were founded: one for commodities, which stayed on the same side of the Sava as the Commodity Stock Exchange, and the department for currencies and receivables, the Currency Exchange, which started operation on the premises of the hotel "Srpska kruna". The Belgrade Stock Exchange was considered to be the best organized financial institution, was one of the oldest exchanges in Europe and the prices established on the Exchange were the referent prices for products on other European exchanges.

In the beginning of the 20th century, various securities were listed on the Exchange. The most wanted and the most stable ones were government securities, which is quite understandable as people trusted the state more than public companies. The rule to observe was "if you want to eat well, invest in shares. But, if you want to sleep well, invest in government bonds". Between the two world wars, after a four-year break and in a difficult economic situation, the Exchange resumed its business. It prepared the regulatory framework and internal rules and regulations and consequently achieved new results.

The development of the Exchange enabled the building of the Exchange own offices, as it needed modern working conditions, adequate premises, new technical possibilities, modern means of communication, laboratories, functioning of the Exchange court, etc. In 1934, the Exchange moved into the new building on the King's Square no. 13. The turnover increased, the business results were better, each day the Exchange was visited by 100–150 persons and the quotations were printed in 1000 copies, in three languages.

This was the most intensive period until the great world crisis, which affected the Serbian economy as well. In the last days of the Exchange existence, Prime Minister of the Government of the Kingdom of Yugoslavia, university professor Milan Stojadinović, was appointed President of the Exchange. One of the last meetings of the Exchange board of directors was held on 28. March 1941. The Exchange lasted until 1953, when it was formally abolished by the Decision of the Presidium of the Serbian government. A number of famous traders, bankers and members of the Exchange disappeared during the war, or were convicted either as enemies of the regime or simply as unwanted persons. Thus the Exchange lost the people who had founded it and enabled its work. Many of them were deprived of their property and a large part of documentation and material from the old Exchange building was destroyed.

With a change in the general climate and the beginning of the economic reforms, after adoption of the Law on the capital market in 1989, the Founding Assembly of the Yugoslav Capital Market, established by 32 biggest banks from the territory of former Yugoslavia, was held. In 1992, the Yugoslav Capital Market changed its name to the Belgrade Stock Exchange. In the 1990s, the trading material mostly consisted of debt instruments of companies, government bonds and the like. Although the first share trade was carried out in 1991 (companies Sintelon and Auto kuća Kikinda), it was only in 2000 that a significant step forward was made, when shares from the previous privatization processes were included in secondary trading. In 1996, the Belgrade Stock Exchange traded in commodity-commercial notes of the Commodity Reserves with the underlying in corn, maize, sugar and oil, while the first municipal bonds were traded on the Exchange in 2000, as well as the first treasury notes of the National Bank of Yugoslavia. In 2001, the introduction of RS bonds for covering the government debt with respect to the old foreign currency savings further boosted the growth of the domestic capital market. Since its re-establishment, the operation of the Belgrade Stock Exchange has not been interrupted, not even during the NATO intervention in 1999.

During 2003 and 2004, there were significant improvements in the development of the BELEX trading system, continuous and remote trading was introduced and international cooperation with other developed exchanges as well as with the exchanges from the region was enhanced. The first index of the Belgrade Stock Exchange was published in late 2004, and up to this day the Exchange has continued to develop other stock exchange indicators. In 2005, the Exchange focused on the improvement of the information process and launched its first information services for data distribution in real time. In 2006, the Exchange started to organize educational courses for the general public and improved its cooperation with issuers of securities, which in April 2007 led to the first security listing.

On 22 February 2016, the Belgrade Stock Exchange, along with the Ljubljana Stock Exchange, decided to join SEE Link, and EBRD-sponsored regional network for trading securities.

The Belgrade Stock Exchange is a member of the Federation of Euro-Asian Stock Exchanges.

Directors

Dimitrije Stamenković 1894
Milan Stojadinović 1941
Gordana Dostanić 2002 – 2015
Siniša Krneta 2015 –

Indexes

Belgrade Stock Exchange currently has two indices:
 BELEXline, the general benchmark index of the Belgrade Stock Exchange.
 BELEX15, representing the 15 most liquid stocks.

See also

 List of European stock exchanges
 List of companies of Serbia
 Economy of Serbia
 National Bank of Serbia
 Serbian dinar

References

External links
 Official website

Organizations established in 1894
Stock exchanges in Europe
Stock Exchange
Stock Exchange
Business organizations based in Serbia
1894 establishments in Serbia